The Thoroughbred is a 1916 American silent drama film directed by Charles Bartlett starring Charlotte Burton and Jack Prescott. It should not be confused with the identically titled Triangle Film production The Thoroughbred of the same year.

Cast
 Charlotte Burton as Angela Earle
 Jack Prescott as Tom Cook
 William Russell as Kelso Hamilton
 Roy Stewart as George Carewe
 Lizette Thorne as Jessie Cook

External links

1916 films
1916 drama films
Silent American drama films
American silent short films
American black-and-white films
1916 short films
Films directed by Charles Bartlett
1910s American films